John Blennerhassett may refer to:

John Blennerhassett (English MP) (1521–1573), English MP
John Blennerhassett (judge) (c. 1560–1624), English judge
John Blennerhassett (died 1677) (died 1677), Anglo-Irish MP for Tralee
John Blennerhassett (died 1709) (c. 1660–1709), Anglo-Irish MP for Tralee, Dingle and County Kerry
John Blennerhassett (1691–1775) (1691–1775), Anglo-Irish MP for County Kerry and Tralee
John Blennerhassett (1715–1763) (1715–1763), Anglo-Irish MP for Kerry
John Blennerhassett (1769–1794), (1769–1794), Anglo-Irish MP for Kerry
John Blennerhassett (politician) (1930–2013), Irish Fine Gael politician